Fiji national rugby team may refer to:

 Fiji national rugby league team
 Fiji national rugby union team
 Fiji national rugby sevens team
 Fiji women's national rugby union team
 Fiji women's national rugby sevens team